Kansas is currently divided into 4 congressional districts, each represented by a member of the United States House of Representatives. The number of districts in Kansas remained unchanged after the 2010 census. From 2010 to 2018, the state's congressional delegation was composed of all Republicans. However, following the 2018 elections, one incumbent was ousted by a Democratic challenger, changing the state's delegation to a 3-1 Republican majority.

Current districts and representatives
List of members of the United States House delegation from Kansas, their terms, their district boundaries, and the district political ratings according to the CPVI. For the 118th Congress, the state's congressional delegation consists of 3 Republicans and 1 Democrat.

History
Historically, the state has held as many as eight seats (1893–1933). The number of congressional seats decreased from five to four following the 1990 census.  Between 1990 and 2000, the population of Kansas grew by 8.5% from 2,477,574 to 2,688,418, making it the 32nd most populated state; all four congressional seats were retained.

Historical and present district boundaries
Table of United States congressional district boundary maps in the State of Kansas, presented chronologically. All redistricting events that took place in Kansas between 1973 and 2013 are shown.

Obsolete districts
Kansas Territory's at-large congressional district
Kansas's at-large congressional district
Kansas's 5th congressional district
Kansas's 6th congressional district
Kansas's 7th congressional district
Kansas's 8th congressional district

See also

List of United States congressional districts
United States congressional apportionment

References

Kansas Legislative Research Department (June 19, 2001): 1992 Congressional Districts with selected cities and county populations (pdf, 741 kb).  "This map is designed to be printed on 11 x 17 inch or larger format paper."
Kansas Legislative Research Department (July 31, 2002): Guidelines and Criteria for 2002 Kansas Congressional and Legislative Redistricting, 2 pages (pdf).
National Committee for an Effective Congress (June 22, 2004).